The canton of Liévin-Sud  is a former canton situated in the department of the Pas-de-Calais and in the Nord-Pas-de-Calais region of northern France. It was disbanded following the French canton reorganisation which came into effect in March 2015. It had a total of 24,326 inhabitants (2012).

Geography 
The canton is organised around Liévin in the arrondissement of Lens. The altitude varies from 31m (Éleu-dit-Leauwette) to 106 m (Angres) for an average altitude of 55m.

The canton comprised 3 communes:
Angres
Éleu-dit-Leauwette
Liévin (partly)

See also 
Cantons of Pas-de-Calais 
Communes of Pas-de-Calais 
Arrondissements of the Pas-de-Calais department

References

Former cantons of Pas-de-Calais
2015 disestablishments in France
States and territories disestablished in 2015